Ola Ahlvarsson (born March 24, 1970) is a Swedish entrepreneur based out of Stockholm, Ibiza and Miami. He is one of the founders of Result and is currently the chairman of its board.

Ahlvarsson has a background as an entrepreneur working as an Internet strategist, business accelerator and a managerial advisor for Fortune 500 and small medium-sized companies. Ahlvarsson has authored the book 'Ola "Mission Possible" Ahlvarsson' which was published in Swedish by Midas in 2005,. An English version was released in 2008. Ahlvarsson is a frequent speaker at various international leading industry events such as the World Economic Forum, DLD, Le Web amongst others. He holds an MBA from the Stockholm University and, was the course director and the executive MBA Program Faculty member at Stockholm School of Economics in Riga. Ahlvarsson also holds the World champion title in kickboxing (Wakko).

Entrepreneurial Activities

Ola was part of several Swedish start up companies after leaving school, Swedish Body Armour Group, Soups & Subs, Music Zone and Internet Media Web Store as well as investing in a small real estate operation in Bollnäs, Sweden.

In 1997, Ahlvarsson was one of the early pioneers of the European Internet scene as a co-founder of Boxman, at the time the largest European e-commerce store selling CDs online. Boxman was founded by two teams of entrepreneurs, one with roots in Musiczone.se, with Fredrik Sidfalk, Ola Ahlvarsson and Gustaf Burström and, the other with roots in Videobutiken led by Krister Hanner, Kent Granat, Bill Odqvist and Håkan Damberg. The company was founded by among others, former SAS CEO Jan Carlzon and Kjell Spångberg. Ahlvarsson was Vice President International and helped internationalize operations for the company, setting up local offices in various European markets.

During his stint with Boxman, while trying to internationalize its operations, Ahlvarsson conceived the idea of creating a company that could help companies parachute success from one market to the other by creating a service organisation that works as an extended arm and leg to the management team to internationalise faster and cheaper, similar to the way music labels worked with the artists in the record industry.

Result
In June 1999, Result was founded in Stockholm, Sweden. Result is an international network of business coaches founded in Stockholm, that helps companies execute success across various markets using new business methods / technology. To date, Result has been involved in approximately 150 launches across Europe, the US and Asia. He was the CEO of Result from June 1999 to November 2008. Ahlvarsson is currently the chairman of Result.

In 2005, Ahlvarsson assisted in the launch of Fon, today the world's largest WiFi Community, expanding FON into Scandinavia and Russia. Ahlvarsson and his partners at Result have been responsible for the growth of professional online network XING (formerly called openBC) in Scandinavia, Benelux, France and Spain. Ahlvarsson has worked with several other leading companies such as Blocket, Rebtel, Movilisto, Polarrose, Google, helping them grow in various capacities.

Ahlvarsson was most recently on the board of Emmy award-winning Company P, leading Swedish fitness retailer Budo Fitness stores,  luxury magazine Connoisseur and the chairman and main shareholder of Nöjesguiden, Sweden's largest entertainment magazine. Ahlvarsson also co-founded Sellbranch together with Advertising veteran Fredrik Sellgren to build a premium yield-management ad system driven by strong sales and technology.

In 2008, Ola Ahlvarsson and 3 Result partners acquired 100% of the shares in Spray (former Lycos) one of Europe's pioneer brand on the web with a portal business that includes Spraydate, a leading Swedish dating site in the fun and flirt segment and Spraymail, Sweden's largest independent mail service. The same constellation also acquired Passagen, Sweden's largest blog portal and discussion forum. The sellers where media house Allers and directories company Eniro.

Together with Spray, Spraydate, Spraymail, Passagen, Nöjesguiden and Sellbranch, the owners consolidated all the companies to form a new age media company. The vision of all the acquisitions was to bring together reach and new technological formats in the advertising world. The media group was called Keynote Media Group. During 2013 and 2014, Keynote Media Group properties were sold. Spraydate was sold to Match.com and Spray was sold to Snowfall in 2014. Nöjesguiden was acquired by investors and the management in 2013. A majority stake was acquired in Sellbranch by Swiss Media company Publi Grouppe.

Ahlvarsson is also a co-founder of Starstable.com, the first massively multiplayer online game for players focusing on horse riding, adventures in a world where fantasy meets reality of horsekeeping. Starstable is available across Europe, Americas and Australia.

Ahlvarsson has portfolios in Fon, Ulvhälls Herrgård, Wemind, Antipode Wines, Result, SIME, some parts of Keynote Media. Ahlvarsson was the chairman and main shareholder of Torget, Sweden's oldest e-commerce portal with over 400 Swedish e-commerce partners until it was sold to European Directories in 2005. Ahlvarsson also served as the chairman and main shareholder in Letsbuyit.com that was sold to Europe Vision in 2006.

Public speaking
Ahlvarsson is a frequent speaker in conferences and industry events, some of which include Le Web Paris, Tech Talk Menorca, DLD, PICNIC Amsterdam, World Knowledge Forum in Seoul, the "World Economic Forum", the "Global Internet Summit" and the "European Online Publishing Conference". Ahlvarsson is also the curator and host of SIME which has events in Stockholm and Miami in 2014.

Awards and honors

Ahlvarsson has received nominations for "Top Ten Leading European Internet Entrepreneurs 1999" by the Wall Street Journal. Similar honors have been rendered by Business Week (January 2000) and Financial Times (May 2000). Ahlvarsson has twice been invited to the World Economic Forum in Davos, where he has been elected "Global Leader for Tomorrow" together with thought leading businessmen, political-, religious- and artistic leaders.

In 2004 Ahlvarsson became an E-Strategies Course Director and Executive MBA Program lecturer at the Stockholm School of Economics in Riga. 

In 2014, Ahlvarsson was awarded the "keys to the city of Miami" by Mayor Phillip Levine for his contributions to the entrepreneurial community.

Martial Arts
Ahlvarsson has been an ardent student of martial arts. He has a black belt in Karate, world champion gold medal in Goju Ryu 1991 in Nha Okinawa. He was the Goju Ryu European champion in 1994, England, Swedish Champion in kung Fu 1996, Swedish kick boxing champion 1996 and World champion in kickboxing (wakko) in 1997 in Dubrovnik. Ahlvarsson still spends time training various martial art activities.
Ahlvarsson made a comeback from 2011–2013 into martial arts world, where he won gold and silver in the Swedish Taekwondo championships and represented Sweden in 2 European and one world championship. He also got a silver medal in the Swedish karate championships, the first karate competition he has competed in for over 20 years.

References

External links

 [https://www.xing.com/profile/Ola_Ahlvarsson XING Profile
 Business Week Interview
 Ahlvarsson Blog Profile
 Ahlvarsson Swedish Wiki
 Ahlvarsson on Flickr
 Ahlvarsson at Tech Talk Menorca 2008

Living people
1970 births
21st-century Swedish businesspeople
Academic staff of the Stockholm School of Economics
Swedish expatriates in the United States
Businesspeople from Stockholm